The R131 road is a regional road in Dublin, Ireland.

The official description of the R131 from the Roads Act 1993 (Classification of Regional Roads) Order 2012  reads:

R131: Drumcondra Road - East Link Bridge - Merrion Gates, Dublin

Between its junction with R132 at Drumcondra Road and its junction with R118 at Merrion Road via Clonliffe Road, Poplar Row, East Wall Road, East Link Toll Bridge, Toll Bridge Road, Sean Moore Road, Beach Road and Strand Road all in the city of Dublin.

See also
Roads in Ireland
National primary road
National secondary road
Regional road

References

Regional roads in the Republic of Ireland
Roads in County Dublin